So Warm is an album by jazz vocalist Etta Jones that was recorded in 1961 and released on the Prestige label.

Reception

The Allmusic site awarded the album 3 stars.

Track listing 
 "Unchained Melody" (Alex North, Hy Zaret) – 4:16     
 "I Laughed at Love" (Benny Davis, Abner Silver) – 3:30     
 "You Don't Know What Love Is" (Gene de Paul, Don Raye) – 3:05     
 "Hurry Home" (Buddy Bernier, Bob Emmerich, Joseph Meyer) – 3:33     
 "I Wish I Didn't Love You So" (Frank Loesser) – 2:02     
 "You Better Go Now" (Robert Graham, Bickley Reichmer) – 1:55     
 "And This Is My Beloved" (George Forrest, Robert Wright) – 3:00     
 "I'm Through With Love" (Gus Kahn, Fud Livingston, Matty Malneck) – 4:01     
 "If You Were Mine" (Malneck, Johnny Mercer) – 2:40     
 "Can You Look Me in the Eyes" (Ted McMichael) – 2:45     
 "How Deep Is the Ocean?" (Irving Berlin) – 3:30     
 "All My Life" (Sidney Mitchell, Sam H. Stept) – 3:40  
Recorded at Van Gelder Studio in Englewood Cliffs, New Jersey on June 9, 1961 (tracks 3, 5, 9 & 12), July 25, 1961 (tracks 2, 6, 7 & 10), and July 28, 1961 (tracks 1, 4, 8 & 11).

Personnel 
Etta Jones – vocals
Ray Alonge, Richard Berg, Joe Singer – French horn
Phil Bodner, Arthur Clarke, Eric Dixon, Jerome Richardson – reeds 
Mal Waldron – piano 
George Duvivier – bass 
Bill English, Charlie Persip – drums 
Oliver Nelson – arranger, conductor
Unidentified strings

References 

Etta Jones albums
1961 albums
Prestige Records albums
Albums recorded at Van Gelder Studio
Albums produced by Esmond Edwards
Albums arranged by Oliver Nelson